The 1987 Trans America Athletic Conference baseball tournament was held at J. I. Clements Stadium on the campus of Georgia Southern in Statesboro, Georgia, from April 30 to May 2. This was the ninth tournament championship held by the Trans America Athletic Conference, in its ninth year of existence.  won their third tournament championship and earned the conference's automatic bid to the 1987 NCAA Division I baseball tournament.

Format and seeding 
The top two finishers from each division by conference winning percentage qualified for the tournament, with the top seed from one division playing the second seed from the opposite in the first round.

Bracket

All-Tournament Team 
The following players were named to the All-Tournament Team. No MVP was named until 1985.

Most Valuable Player 
Brett Hendley was named Tournament Most Valuable Player. Hendley was a first baseman for Georgia Southern.

References 

Tournament
ASUN Conference Baseball Tournament
Trans America Athletic Conference baseball tournament
Trans America Athletic Conference baseball tournament
Trans America Athletic Conference baseball tournament